Saerbeck is a municipality in the district of Steinfurt, in North Rhine-Westphalia, Germany. It is situated approximately 30 km west of Osnabrück and 25 km north of Münster.

Twin city

 Rietavas, Lithuania
  Ferrières-en-Gâtinais, France
  Commerce, Georgia, United States

References

Steinfurt (district)